Francesco de Tatti (also known as Francesco de'Tatti) was an Italian painter known for a few handfuls of works. He was active in the Renaissance period from 1512 to 1520, in Varese.

References
 Current and forthcoming exhibitions (Leger galleries May 3–27). by B. N. The Burlington Magazine (1972); p 349.

External links

 https://instagram.com/vanshika.sachdeva.99?igshid=11kgc1rtzbyog

Italian Renaissance painters
16th-century Italian painters
Italian male painters
Painters from Milan
1470 births
1532 deaths